The Kichesipirini ("People of the Great River", "Island Indians") are an Algonquin indigenous people of Canada. Their traditional homeland and primary village was located on Morrison Island (also called Morrison's Island) in the Ottawa River (which the Kichesipirini refer to as "Kitcisìpi" or "Kichesippi"), as well as territory on both sides of the river in Ontario and Quebec, including L'Isle-aux-Allumettes (Allumette Island) in the Pontiac Regional County Municipality, Quebec, located just to the east of Morrison Island. Most Kichesipirini today live in nearby Pembroke, Ontario, with others living elsewhere in Canada as well as in the United States. Some Kichesipirini still speak a dialect of the Algonquin language.

Despite apparently being the first Algonquin nation encountered by French explorers in the early 17th century (Samuel de Champlain met their chief, Tessouat, in the summer of 1603, and visited their village in May 1613), the Kichesipirini are not federally recognized by the Canadian government, and thus have no reserve. Nevertheless, the group based in Pembroke is constituted as the Kichesipirini Algonquin First Nation, with the current chief sachem being Paula LaPierre. The group is actively seeking to gain full participation rights in negotiations on the Algonquin Land Claim.

Notable Kichesipirini
Timothy Archambault, Native American flutist and architect
Paula LaPierre, chief sachem
Tessouat, 17th century chief

External links
Kichesipirini page
Article
Article

First Nations in Ontario
First Nations in Quebec
First Nations in Renfrew County
Algonquian peoples
Algonquian ethnonyms
Algonquin